is a Japanese former ski jumper who competed at World Cup level between 2002 and 2022.

Career
He won two bronze medals in the team large hill event at the FIS Nordic World Ski Championships (2007, 2009). He won four world cup individual competitions. Competing in two Winter Olympics, Ito earned his best finish of fifth in the team large hill event at Vancouver in 2010, He finished 20th in the individual event and 5th in the team event of a FIS Ski Flying World Championships 2004. In the World Cup he has finished in the top 10 a total of fourteen times. This includes four podium finishes with his best result being second at Sapporo on 22 January 2006.

World Cup

Standings

Wins

References

External links
 
 
 

1985 births
Living people
Japanese male ski jumpers
Ski jumpers at the 2006 Winter Olympics
Ski jumpers at the 2010 Winter Olympics
Ski jumpers at the 2014 Winter Olympics
Ski jumpers at the 2018 Winter Olympics
Ski jumpers at the 2022 Winter Olympics
Olympic ski jumpers of Japan
Sportspeople from Hokkaido
FIS Nordic World Ski Championships medalists in ski jumping
Olympic bronze medalists for Japan
Olympic medalists in ski jumping
Medalists at the 2014 Winter Olympics
21st-century Japanese people